Vasyl Tkachuk (Ukrainian: Василь Ткачук; 13 January 1916 in Illintsi village (ukr.: Іллінці), nowadays Kolomyia Raion, Ivano-Frankivsk Oblast (ukr.: Івано-Франківська область) – 19 October 1944 in East Prussia), Ukrainian self-taught writer-poet, eulogist of Hutsulshchyna (ukr.: Гуцульщина), political and social activist.

Life 
Vasyl Tkachuk was born in a very poor rural family to Ivan and Olena Tkachuk. He had two siblings, brother Oleksiy (born in 1904) and sister Mariya (born in 1912). The size of poverty in which Tkachuk grew up can be picture by living conditions: one chamber hut (about 16 m²) occupied by two families, ten people altogether.

After death of Tkachuk’s father and grandmother in 1921 the responsibility to provide for the family went to his mother, Olena.

In 1922 Tkachuk started his education in a local primary school, which he finished in 1930.  During this period he wrote his first poems.
Tkachuk led a very active life, both socially and politically. He was interested in ethnography; was a member of local choreographic group "Prosvita" (ukr.: Просвіта) and a member of "Sel-Rob Ednist" (ukr.: Сель-Pоб Єдність) political group. At the age of 15 Tkachuk was arrested for drawing a caricature of Józef Piłsudski, later realised due to young age. Arrested again in 1922 for propaganda against Polish nobility (Polish: Szlachta).
In 1934 he moved to Lviv where he published his novels in a local press. He was connected with a literary group of young writers and journalists called "The Twelve" (ukr.: "Дванадцятка").
In 1937 Tkachuk married Maria Janusz and 1938 their daughter Olha was born.
After aggression of Soviet Union on Poland in 1940, Tkachuk joined Writer’s Union of Ukraine (ukr.: Національна Спілка Письменників України), and became a student of Lviv University (ukr: Львівський університет).
In 1941 Tkachuk joined to Red Army and was killed during the East Prussian Offensive.

Works 
The rural families, their habits, culture, everyday life had a great influence on Tkachuk’s works, where he often described life of the local society. Tkachuk is compared to Vasyl Stefanyk for using Hutsul dialect in his works.
 1933: Великдень іде
 1935: Весілля на Покутті – published in "Життя і знання" magazine, No. 97 (10)
 1935: Сині чічки, збірка новел (a collection of short stories)
 1936: Золоті дзвінки, збірка новел (a collection of short stories)
 1938: Зимова мелодія, збірка новел (a collection of short stories)
 1940: Весна, збірка новел (a collection of short stories)
 1973: Новели, збірка (a collection of short stories)

References

Other sources
 Вільде, Ірина. Незбагненне серце. Львів: Каменяр, 1990. pp. 225–227.
 Гординський, Ярослав. Літературна критика підсовєтської україни. Львів-Київ, 1939.
 Грицков’ян, Ярослав. Українські письменники міжвоєнного двадцятиліття. Львів, 1994.
 Карманський, Петро. Українська богема. Львів: Олір, 1996. .
 Курдидик, Анатоль. Богдан з іншого боку. Спроба портрету цього мого близького друга. Терем: проблеми української культури. Детройт, 1971. No. 4. pp. 19–30
 Лучук, В. Письменник-демократ. Львів, 1973.
 Огієнко, Іван. Ткачук Василь: Зимова мелодія//Рідна мова. 1939.
 Рудницький М. Ткачук Василь: Весна// Література і мистецтво. 1940 No. 1.
 Хороб, Степан Іванович. Слово- образ- форма: у пошуках художності. Івано-Франківськ: Плай, 2000. .
 Тарнавський, Остап. Літературний Львів 1939-1944. Львів: Просвіта, 1995.

1916 births
1944 deaths
People from Ivano-Frankivsk Oblast
People from the Kingdom of Galicia and Lodomeria
Ukrainian male short story writers
Ukrainian short story writers
Soviet military personnel killed in World War II